Marie-Noëlle Drouet, known as Minou Drouet (born 24 July 1947), of La Guerche-de-Bretagne, France, is a former poet, musician, and actor.

Biography 
Drouet gained fame in 1955 when some of her poems and letters circulated privately among French writers and publishers, generating controversy over whether or not Drouet's mother Claude was their true author.  Drouet soon overcame much of this skepticism by writing poems before witnesses without her mother present. In one such test, she wrote a poem to gain admission to France's Society of Authors, Composers and Music Publishers. Drouet also studied piano and guitar.  Throughout the late 1950s and early 1960s, Drouet toured as an author and musician. Jean Cocteau said famously of Drouet, "Tous les enfants ont du génie sauf Minou Drouet" (In English: "All children nine years old have genius, except Minou Drouet"). Michel Attenoux named his "Minou Drouet Stomp", featuring Sidney Bechet, after her.

After her grandmother became ill around 1966, Drouet worked as a nurse for two years before returning to public life as a singer-songwriter and children's novelist.   She wrote one adult novel; its title in English translation was Donatella.

Eventually, Drouet returned to her childhood home in La Guerche-de-Bretagne.  She now lives with her husband Jean-Paul Le Canu and has left public life except to publish a memoir, Ma vérité, in 1993.  New Yorker critic Robert Gottlieb describes Ma vérité as "reticent and skimpy," saying that it focuses on facts rather than subjective interpretations of Drouet's childhood.

Bibliography

Works in English 
Arbre, mon ami, translator Christine Tacq. Thame [England] : 1998. 
Then there was fire translator Margaret Crosland, London : Hamish Hamilton, 1957.

Books by Minou Drouet
 Poèmes., Genève, R. Kister, 1956. 
 Arbre, mon ami (1957)
 Le Pêcheur de lune (1959)
 Du brouillard dans les yeux (1966)
 La Patte bleue (1966)
 Ouf de la forêt (1968) 
 La Flamme rousse (1968, illustrated by Daniel Billon)
 Ma vérité (1993)
 Then there was fire (1957), translated by Margaret Crosland

Texts about Minou Drouet
 L'Affaire Minou Drouet (André Parinaud, 1956) 
 Roland Barthes, « La littérature selon Minou Drouet », article published at Les Lettres nouvelles and retaken in the book Mythologies, 1957.

References

External links
 Article in Paris Match (1955) 
 Excerpt from autobiography of Charles Templeton.  (The section on Drouet begins about halfway through this chapter.)

French poets
Child writers
Living people
1947 births